The seduction novel is a literary genre which was popular in the late 18th and early 19th centuries. A seduction novel presents the story of a virtuous, but helpless woman who is seduced by a man that will eventually betray her. "Inevitably, she yields herself to him; inevitably, she dies." Her failure to adhere to the commonly accepted standard of sexual behaviour leads to her "self-destruction and death".

Examples include Charlotte Temple by Susanna Rowson (1791), The Coquette by Hannah Webster Foster (1797), and the short story The Quadroons by Lydia Maria Child (1842). Harriet Jacobs's autobiography Incidents in the Life of a Slave Girl (1861) is in some ways linked to this genre, but here the sexual transgression of the narrator doesn't lead to self-destruction, but the book ends with the narrator's gaining freedom for herself and her children.

The Coquette and Charlotte Temple were two of the first bestsellers in America and were popular among most critics during their publication.

References 

Literary genres